Yeremeyevo is a rural locality (a village) in Novlenskoye Rural Settlement, Vologodsky District, Vologda Oblast, Russia. The population was 8 as of 2002.

Geography 
The distance to Vologda is 66 km, to Novlenskoye is 6 km. Kryukovo, Gorvovo, Filyutino, Gorka-Ilyinskaya, Yermolovskoye are the nearest rural localities.

References 

Rural localities in Vologodsky District